Lesbian, gay, bisexual and transgender (LGBT) rights in Brazil rank among the highest in the world. 

Gay couples in Brazil have enjoyed the same rights guaranteed to heterosexual ones since 16 May 2013, including marriage.  On June 13, 2019, the Brazilian Supreme Court ruled that discrimination on the basis of sexual orientation and gender identity is a crime akin to racism. 

On May 5, 2011, the Supreme Federal Court voted in favor of granting same-sex couples the same 112 legal rights as married couples. The decision was approved by a 10–0 vote with one abstention – one justice abstained because he had spoken publicly in favor of same-sex unions when he was attorney general. The ruling gave same-sex couples in stable partnerships the same financial and social rights enjoyed by those in opposite-sex relationships. Consequently, on May 14, 2013, the Justice's National Council of Brazil legalized same-sex marriage in the entire country in a 14–1 vote by issuing a ruling that orders all civil registers of the country to perform same-sex marriages and convert any existing civil unions into marriages if the couples so desire. Joaquim Barbosa, then president of the Council of Justice and the Supreme Federal Court, said in the decision that notaries cannot continue to refuse to "perform a civil wedding or the conversion of a stable civil union into a marriage between persons of the same sex." The ruling was published on May 15 and took effect on May 16, 2013.

The status of LGBT rights in Brazil has expanded since the end of the military dictatorship in 1985, and the creation of the new Constitution of Brazil of 1988. In 2019, whose results were released in May 2022, survey conducted by Brazilian Institute of Geography and Statistics (IBGE) with a total of 108.000 households (representing the entire population) has indicated that 2.9 million Brazilians self-identify as homosexual or bisexual (1.8% of the population aged 18 and over). 

According to the Guinness World Records, the São Paulo Gay Pride Parade is the world's largest LGBT Pride celebration, with 4 million people attending in 2009. Brazil had 60,002 same-sex couples living together and 37,5 million heterosexual couples , according to the Brazilian Census of 2010 (IBGE). The country has about 300 active LGBT organizations.

According to a 2022 Datafolha survey, the percentage of Brazilians who think homosexuality should be accepted by society had increased from 64% in 2014 to 79% in 2022. However, Brazil is reported to have the highest LGBT murder rate in the world, with more than 380 murders in 2017 alone, an increase of 30% compared to 2016. That same year, Brazil also reported the highest homicide rate in its history, with a total of 63,880 homicides.

Timeline of LGBT history in Brazil

 1830: Dom Pedro I signed into law the Imperial Penal Code. It eliminated all references to sodomy.
 1979: O Lampião, a gay magazine, with contributions by many famous authors, like João Silvério Trevisan, Aguinaldo Silva and Luiz Mott, was launched. It survived for just a year.
 1980: Grupo Gay da Bahia, the oldest gay rights organization in Brazil, was founded in the city of Salvador, together with SOMOS, another organization in the city of São Paulo.
 1983: Uprising at Ferro's Bar when its lesbian clientele was denied entrance. This led to the 19th of August being recognised as National Day of Lesbian Pride.
 1989: The constitutions of Mato Grosso and Sergipe states are signed into law. They explicitly forbid discrimination on the ground of sexual orientation.
 1995: Congresswoman Marta Suplicy proposed Bill project No. 1151 concerning civil unions.
1995: Brazil's first pride parade on Copacabana Beach in Rio de Janeiro
 1997: G Magazine, the first gay-oriented erotic magazine, was published enjoying large and national distribution until its final issue in 2013.
 2004: Rio Grande do Sul began allowing same-sex partners to register civil unions in a generic civil law notary after a court decision in March 2004.
 2006: A lesbian couple from Rio Grande do Sul was the first to successfully adopt.
October, 2006: Fashion designer and television presenter Clodovil Hernandes became the first openly gay person to be elected as a congressman in Brazil, with 494,000 votes.
 June 10, 2007: In its eleventh edition, the São Paulo Gay Pride Parade broke its own record as the biggest parade in the world and attracted 3.5 million people.
 June 25, 2007: The Richarlyson affair occurred in which a judge was brought before the Justice Council of São Paulo for stating in court that soccer is a "virile, masculine sport and not a homosexual one." However, afterwards, the same judge apologized and decided to annul the decision he wrote.
 2008: A national LGBT conference was held. The event, the first in the world to be organized by a government, was a result of demands made by civil society and the Brazilian Government's support of LGBT rights.
 2010: In a landmark trial, the 4th Class of the Superior Court of Justice of Brazil acknowledged, unanimously, that same-sex couples have the right to adopt children.
 2011: On May 5, the Supreme Federal Court unanimously extended stable unions (Portuguese: união estável) to same-sex couples nationwide by redefining the laic definition of the family and providing 112 rights to these couples. The extension of marriage was not discussed in this decision.
 2011: On June 27, the first same-sex civil union was converted into a same-sex marriage in Brazil. The conversion was ordered by a São Paulo judge. Since this case, many other civil unions have been converted into full marriages.
 2011: On October 25, the Superior Court of Justice declared that the legal union of two women who could be recognized as a marriage. Differently from the U.S. Supreme Court's "stare decisis", the Superior Court decision would only reach the authors of the demand, but stood as a precedent that could be followed in similar cases.
 2013: On May 14, the Justice's National Council of Brazil legalized same-sex marriage in the entire country in a 14–1 vote by issuing a ruling that orders all civil registers of the country to perform same-sex marriages and convert any existing civil unions into marriages if such a couple desires.
 2018: On March 1, the Brazilian Supreme Court ruled that transgender people may change their legal gender without undergoing surgery, hormonal therapy or receiving a medical diagnosis.
2018: In October, following the 2018 Brazilian general election, Fabiano Contarato was elected as the country's first openly gay senator and Érica Malunguinho as the first trans woman representative. 
 2019: On February 1, David Miranda, a black gay representative, replaced Jean Wyllys, as Wyllys announced in January 2019 that he had left the country due to death threats. This was the first time that a gay representative was replaced by another gay representative in Brazil.
 2019: On June 13, the Brazilian Supreme Court ruled that discrimination on the basis of sexual orientation and gender identity is a crime akin to racism.
 2020: Supreme Court permits MSM to donate blood with no deferral period.
2021: A rule of the National Council of Justice allows to register intersex children with the ignored sex on birth certificates.

Recognition of same-sex relationships

On May 14, 2013, the Justice's National Council of Brazil legalized same-sex marriage (also commonly) in the entire country in a 14–1 vote by issuing a ruling that orders all civil registers of the country to perform same-sex marriages and convert any existing civil unions into marriages if such a couple desires. Joaquim Barbosa, president of the Council of Justice and the highest court of constitutional law in Brazil - the Supreme Federal Court - said in the decision that notaries cannot continue to refuse to "perform a civil wedding or the conversion of a stable civil union into a marriage between persons of the same sex."

On December 16, 2003, Brazil announced that it would recognize legal same-sex unions performed abroad for immigration purposes. Couples who are married in other countries can use their union certificate to apply for immigration benefits to Brazil. It was the first legal action to the recognition of same-sex couples.

According to the Grupo Gay da Bahia (Gay Group of Bahia; GGB), the Instituto Nacional de Segurança Social (National Institute of Social Security; INSS) recognizes stable unions as a means for sharing inheritance, receiving a pension, and other rights similar to marriage.

Many Brazilian cities have also instituted a Register of Homosexual Stable Union. In 2009, one of the offices of the city of São Paulo recorded 202 same-sex stable unions. Stable unions grant many legal rights, such as the right to be recognized as a couple in legal issues, common ownership of property acquired jointly, including transmittance and inheritance, recognition of the partner as a dependent at the National Institute of Social Security, on health plans and with insurers. Also included is the right to transfer the bank account of one partner to another in case of death or illness of the holder.

De facto unions may be registered at a civil law notary throughout the country (there are specific ordinances about it in Rio Grande do Sul, Roraima and Piauí, but the right is federal and registration is possible in others places too).

Prior to the nationwide legalisation of same-sex marriage, several binational same-sex couples won the right to live permanently in Brazil. One such case is the case of a binational couple who was forced to leave Brazil and move to Chicago so they could live together. U.S. citizen Chris Bohlander won the right to live permanently in Brazil with his partner Zemir Magalhães. The couple left Chicago three years prior to live together in Goiânia. A Brazilian judge allowed Bohlander to obtain a permanent residency visa, which is normally only given to the foreign spouse of a Brazilian, based on their civil union, which was recognized by a Goiás judge in 2008. In Brazil, the couple's victory was seen as important especially because the ruling is based on the fundamental rights and protections guaranteed under the country's Constitution.

Same-sex couple rights
A bill was proposed in National Congress of Brazil in 1995 to change federal law and allow the recognition of same-sex unions, but it faced strong opposition and was not voted on. Since the late 1990s, however, many concessions have been granted to same-sex couples. Same-sex couples were determined to be de facto partners by the Superior Justice Tribunal in 2006. This gave some rights to same-sex couples through stable unions.

Many independent judicial decisions in Brazil since 1998 have recognized same-sex partnerships in this category under common law and granted various rights to the individuals concerned. There is no actual definition or consensus on what constitutes a stable union. In the state of Rio de Janeiro, the partners of government employees receive the same benefits as married couples. In the state of Rio Grande do Sul in Southern Brazil, judges have determined that same-sex relationships should also be legally recognised. All judges and justices of the peace are now bound to approve civil unions "between persons of sound mind and independent sexual orientation" in the state.

Adoption and parenting

Same-sex adoption is legal in Brazil, because Brazilian laws do not specifically prohibit it. Consequently, several judges have given favorable rulings for adoptions by same-sex couples.

In 2010, in a landmark trial, the 4th Class of the Superior Court of Justice of Brazil (STJ) acknowledged, unanimously, that same-sex couples have the right to adopt children. The court, consisting of five judges, discussed a case of two women who had been given the right to adopt by the Federal Court of Rio Grande do Sul. The State Public Prosecutor, however, appealed to the STJ. The court denied the public prosecutor's request, saying that for such cases, the child's will must be respected. "This trial is historic because it gives to human dignity, the dignity of minors and the two women", said the reporter, Luis Felipe Solomon. "We affirm that this decision is an orientation that in cases like that, you should always serve the interests of the child, that is being adopted", the minister João Otávio de Noronha said. The Superior Court of Justice decision creates a legal precedent that allows same-sex couples to apply to adopt and foster children.

In 2010, Minister Marco Aurélio Mello, of the Supremo Tribunal Federal (Supreme Federal Court of Brazil), ruled in favor of a binational English-Brazilian same-sex couple in the state of Paraná, allowing the couple to adopt any child, regardless of the age or sex of the child. The decision of the Supreme Federal Court opens the way for other same-sex couples to receive the same rights in the country.

Discrimination protections

The states of Brazil are prohibited from creating discriminatory laws, according to the national Constitution. While the Constitution prohibits discrimination on a variety of characteristics, such as "origin, race, sex, colour [and] age", sexual orientation is not explicitly mentioned. The Constitution does forbid "any other forms of discrimination".

Traditional images of Latin America "machismo" and the resulting homophobia are changing now that individual rights, including one's right in accordance with one's sexual orientation, enjoy the protection of the law. Brazil adopted a liberal Constitution in 1988, and continues to provide more protections for all of its citizens. Shortly after electing Luiz Inácio Lula da Silva as Brazil's president, various states took serious measures ensuring that no one would be discriminated against because of their sexual orientation. As of 2003, discrimination on the basis of sexual orientation was prohibited in 73 municipal statutes. Provisions were later enacted in the laws and regulations of the states of Acre (2017), Alagoas (2001/13), Amapá (2009), Amazonas (2006), Bahia (2007/14), the Brazilian Federal District (1997/17), Ceará (2009/14), Espírito Santo (2012/16), Goiás (2008), Mato Grosso (1989/17), Mato Grosso do Sul (2005), Maranhão (2006), Minas Gerais (2002), Pará (2007), Paraíba (2003/17), Paraná (2013), Pernambuco (2012/13), Piauí (2004/17), Rio de Janeiro (2000/10), Rio Grande do Norte (2007), Rio Grande do Sul (2002/16), Rondônia (2018), Roraima (2013), Santa Catarina (2002), São Paulo (2001), Sergipe (1989), and Tocantins (2013). These policies vary by state. Some states (Alagoas, Bahia, the Brazilian Federal District, Ceará, Espírito Santo, Mato Grosso, Pará, Piauí, Santa Catarina, and Sergipe) list sexual orientation among the non-discrimination grounds in their state constitutions. Several states have also established public taskforces and commissions to investigate reports of discrimination. Legal prohibitions of discrimination against transgender people varies from state to state. Many states enacted protections for gender identity at the same time as for sexual orientation, while others did so some years later. As of 2019, Amapá, Minas Gerais, Pará, Santa Catarina and Sergipe do not address discrimination against transgender people.

On November 30, 2000, the City Council of Niterói, in the state of Rio de Janeiro, passed an ordinance prohibiting discrimination based on sexual orientation in public places and institutions as well as in businesses. Many Brazilian cities and states have anti-discriminatory legislation that explicitly includes sexual orientation. Some of them provide specific sanctions and penalties for those who engage in discrimination.

In 2007, the Ministry of Labour and Employment issued Executive Order (Portaria) No. 41/2007, which prohibits employers from requesting documents or information related to an employee's sexuality.

A 2008 survey found that 70% of Brazilians were in favour of banning discrimination against LGBT people. Divided by religion, 54% of Evangelicals supported banning such discrimination, while 70% of Catholics and 79% of atheists also expressed support. Those aged between 16 and 30 were also more likely to support legislation to ban LGBT discrimination.

As of 2019, a federal anti-discrimination law is pending approval on the Brazilian Senate. The Constitution does not have any specific laws on discrimination based on sexual orientation, but it does have a generic anti-discrimination article that can be considered to include such cases. This fact is constantly used by the opposition of the anti-discrimination law to show that there is no need for specific laws. The defenders of the new law, however, argue that without clear designation, this will still be considered somewhat of a lesser crime. Some conservative Catholic and Protestant senators argue that the law would be an aggression on religious freedom granted by the Constitution. Senator Fátima Cleide (PT–RO) said that the law should be approved because "the country has the tragic mark that a homosexual is murdered every two days." Former Evangelical priest and Senator Marcelo Crivella (PRB–RJ) criticized the text, saying homosexuals will receive a protection that "should have been given to women, the elderly and children." In March 2018, the Senate Constitution and Justice Commission approved the federal anti-discrimination law. The bill would need to be approved by the full Senate and Chamber of Deputies before becoming law.

In February 2019, the Federal Supreme Court (Supremo Tribunal Federal) began proceedings to criminalize homophobia and transphobia. The court handed down its ruling on May 23, criminalizing homophobia and transphobia under the country's anti-racism law. Six of the Supreme Court's 11 judges voted in favor of the measure, while the five other judges were granted more time to make their decision. Eventually, on 13 June, the Supreme Court issued its final ruling, in an 8–3 vote. Judge Luiz Fux described homophobic crimes as "alarming" and an "epidemic".

In schools
Multiple states and schools have established guidelines and policies regarding LGBT students. These include, among others, preventing and prohibiting bullying, creating support programmes and using a transgender student's preferred name. The 2004 government initiative, Brasil Sem Homophobia, seeks to further protect LGBT students from discrimination.

In August 2018, the Supreme Federal Court struck down a Palmas law which banned "gender and sexuality courses" in schools.

In June 2021, the PSL-led government of Santa Catarina issued a decree banning the use of gender-neutral language in official documents by public and private schools.

Gender identity and expression

While the term transgender as used in the United States and Europe has come to encompass all gender-variant individuals, including female-to-male transsexuals, drag queens and kings, and intersex individuals, in Brazil the social phenomenon of "transgênero" largely consists of individuals who were assigned male at birth and identify as women. Transgender women in Brazil fall into two categories: "travestis" and transsexuals, although for Brazilians the two terms are interchangeable. To the extent that the latter insist on distinguishing themselves from transvestites, it is because transsexuals consider that they were born into the wrong body, whereas transvestites do not experience as deeply internal conflicts in relation to their male bodies.

The formal labor market is largely closed to transgender people. An extremely small minority of transvestites have university educations or professional qualifications. With few exceptions, the only professions open to them are nursing, domestic service, hairdressing, gay entertainment, and prostitution. In some cases, even those who work as hairdressers, gay nightclub artists and domestic servants also double as sex workers. In the central, north and northeastern regions of Brazil, transgender people from extremely poor families sometimes begin working as prostitutes as early as 12 years of age, especially if they have been expelled from home by their families.

In the south and southeastern regions and in the major capitals, such as São Paulo and Rio de Janeiro, it is common to find transvestites as young as 16 or 17 working in the streets. Despite being included in Brazil's acronym in the struggle for LGBT rights, transgender people receive little outreach from the more mainstream gay and lesbian groups. There are, however, associations of transgender people in several Brazilian states and cities. One program in Rio de Janeiro focuses on the reintegration of transvestites into society through training and employment opportunities.

Brazil's public health system provides free sex reassignment surgery. Federal prosecutors from the state of Rio Grande do Sul had argued that sex reassignment surgery is covered under a constitutional clause guaranteeing medical care as a basic right. In 2007, the 4th Regional Federal Court agreed, saying in its ruling that "from the biomedical perspective, transsexuality can be described as a sexual identity disturbance where individuals need to change their sexual designation or face serious consequences in their lives, including intense suffering, mutilation and suicide." The Health Ministry said it would be up to local health officials to decide who qualifies for the surgery and what priority it will be given compared with other operations within the public health system. Patients must be at least 21 years old and diagnosed as transsexuals with no other personality disorders and must undergo a psychological evaluation for at least two years, the ministry said. Gay activists applauded the decision. So far, the measure has not prompted any opposition. Brazil's public health system offers free health care to all Brazilians, including a variety of surgeries and free AIDS medication. But long lines and poorly equipped facilities mean that those who can afford it usually choose to pay for private hospitals and clinics. The Health Ministry said that since 2000 through 2007, about 250 sex reassignment surgeries had been performed at three university hospitals.

March 2018 rulings
Two landmark transgender rights rulings were handed down on 1 March 2018. First, the Superior Electoral Court ruled that transgender people may run in an election under their preferred name. Transgender advocates hailed the decision, as elections were held in October 2018. Second, the Brazilian Supreme Court unanimously ruled that transgender people may change their legal gender without undergoing surgery or hormonal therapy, which were previously requirements. A transgender individual seeking to change their gender to reflect their gender identity can now simply apply to do so at a registry post in the country, without the need of a judicial document or any medical report.

Military service
There is no law forbidding LGBT people from serving in the Brazilian Armed Forces. Sexual orientation and gender identity cannot be an obstacle for entry into the police force or the military in Brazil. All sexual acts are disallowed between members of the forces, be it heterosexual or homosexual.

The Constitution of Brazil prohibits any form of discrimination in the country. The Brazilian Armed Forces do not permit desertion, sexual acts or congeners in the military, whether heterosexual or homosexual. They claim that it is not a homophobic rule, but a rule of discipline that also includes the opposite sex.

Following the Supreme Federal Tribunal decision in favor of civil unions, Defense Minister Nelson Jobim guaranteed the Ministry's compliance with the decision and mentioned that spousal benefits can be accorded to same-sex spouses of military personnel.

According to a survey conducted by the Institute of Applied Economic Research (IPEA) in 2012, 63.7% of Brazilians supported the entry of LGBT people in the Brazilian Armed Forces.

Conversion therapy
Conversion therapy has been forbidden by the Federal Psychology Council since 1999. In September 2017, a federal judge in Brasília approved the use of conversion therapy by a psychologist to “cure” people of homosexuality, overruling the 1999 decision. However, in December 2017, the same judge changed his decision, keeping the “treatment” banned. Subsequently, the Federal Supreme Court decided to ban conversion therapy. In January 2018, the Federal Psychology Council established norms of performance for psychologists in relation to transsexual and transvestite people, also banning any conversion therapy.

Blood donation
Prior to 2020, under Ministry of Health guidelines, gay and bisexual men were only allowed to donate blood after 12 months without same-sex sexual activity.

However, in May 2020, during the COVID-19 pandemic, the Federal Supreme Court ("Supremo Tribunal Federal") declared the limitation unconstitutional and struck out the restrictions. Consequently, Brazil became one of the first Latin American countries to permit gay and bisexual men to donate blood under terms equal to heterosexual men.

Population

In 2009, a survey conducted by University of São Paulo in ten state capitals, showed that the Brazilian gay male population was of 7.8% and the bisexual male population was 2.6% (total of 10.4% of the total male population). The lesbian population was of 4.9% and the bisexual women another 1.4% (total of 6.3% of the female population).

In 2010, a survey conducted by Rio de Janeiro State University and University of Campinas revealed that by age of 18, 95% of homosexual youth in Brazil had already revealed their homosexuality, with many acknowledging it by the time they were 16. For the 1980s generation, homosexuality was usually revealed after they were 21 years old. Prejudice had also decreased according to data from a survey of Ibope. The same survey found that 60% of Brazilians considered homosexuality as natural.

The male population of the city of Rio de Janeiro was 19.3% of gays and bisexual males. And the female population of the city of Manaus had 10.2% of lesbians and women bisexuals.

In 2009 survey conducted by Projeto Sexualidade (Prosex) with a total of 8.200 people from 10 state capitals has indicated that 7.8% of the interviewed males identified as gay and 2.6% identified as bisexual. Out of the interviewed females, 4.9% identified as lesbians and bisexual women comprised 1.4%

In 2022, based on data collected by the National Health Survey in 2019, the IBGE estimated that there are 2.9 million gay, lesbian or bisexual Brazilians, representing 1.8% of the population.

Proportion of self-reported homosexual or bisexual persons, by U.F. 
Federation units with the proportion of Brazilians self-reported as homosexual or bisexual greater than the national average:

LGBT immigration

To Brazil

A watershed decision issued on November 25, 2003 by Brazilian Judge Ana Carolina Morozowski of the 5th Civil Court of Curitiba, Paraná recognized the same-sex relationship of national gay activist Toni Reis with British citizen David Ian Harrad, granting Harrad permanent residency in Brazil. A week later, the National Immigration Council instituted the Administrative Resolution Number 3, 2003, which "disposes of the criteria for the concession of temporary or permanent visa, or of definitive permanence to the male or female partner, without distinction of sex."

In the city of Florianópolis, Judge Marjôrie Cristina Freiberger Ribeiro da Silva of the 1st Civil Court prevented the Brazilian immigration departments from deporting an Italian citizen who had lived more than ten years in a stable relationship with a lesbian Brazilian. The judge said she believed that "homosexual union creates the same rights as a union between man and woman."

Brazil was the first country in Latin America to recognize same-sex unions for immigration benefits. Following Brazil's example, other countries in South America have made major advances in the recognition of same-sex relationships, including immigration rights, for example, Colombia in 2009.

However, the Brazilian Government was slow in cabling its consulates regarding this decision. Thus, many same-sex couples who sought to move to Brazil to take advantage of this new policy were left confused by the lack of clarity by the Government and unable to receive the benefits this policy was intended to provide. In February 2004, in a joint meeting at the Brazilian consulate in New York, Immigration Equality and the Brazilian Rainbow Group asked the consular officials to clarify the application procedures regarding the new immigration policy. Despite ongoing confusion, the Brazilian Rainbow Group obtained copies of Administrative Resolution No. 3 and accompanying regulations that clarify the rules for same-sex binational couples where one partner is a Brazilian citizen.

In Brazil
Historically, migration by homosexuals from other parts of the country to larger cities has been a common phenomenon, even discounting economic factors in the towns and cities of origin. Factors driving this migration include the perception of increased liberty and independence in large cities as well as many options of entertainment for this demographic. The cities of São Paulo, Rio de Janeiro, Salvador, Brasília, Belo Horizonte, Recife, Porto Alegre, Curitiba, and others, receive large influxes annually.

Social conditions

Anti-LGBT violence

In 2004, the Grupo Gay da Bahia released a list with the names of 159 murdered members of the LGBT community that year. There is also a list with the names of people that allegedly suffered from human rights abuses that same year; some deaths caused directly by homophobia. In 2012, 77% of Brazilians supported the explicit criminalization of homophobia.

In mid-2006, Brazil launched Brazil Against Homophobia, an anti-homophobia campaign including television advertisement and billboards. According to a 2007 BBC article, activists estimate that between 1980 and 2006 some 2,680 gay people were murdered in Brazil, the majority thought to have been killed because of their sexuality.

Brazil has been rated as one of the countries where the most gay people are killed. According to the report "Epidemic of Hate", published in 1996 by the International Gay and Lesbian Human Rights Commission, at least 1,200 gays, lesbians and transsexuals were killed in Brazil alone in a decade. There have been more than 3,000 gay and lesbian people murdered in Brazil since the late 1980s, which has been deemed as a "Homocaust" by Brazilian gay activists. According to the Grupo Gay da Bahia (GGB), Brazil's largest and most active gay organization, a gay, lesbian or transvestite is brutally murdered every two days due to homophobia, with a total of 130 in one year alone. According to GGB's statistics, only 2% of these attacks are on lesbians, but "Love Sees No Borders" believes this number is grossly underestimated for two main reasons. First, a vast percentage of homophobia-related crimes go unreported. Second, a large number of hate crimes in Brazil are committed by police officers, thus elevating the number of people unwilling to report a crime. Moreover, brutality against lesbians can often take the form of violent rape; if a victim comes forward, the charge will be rape, not a hate crime against a lesbian.

Sexualidade e Crimes de Ódio (Sexuality and Hate Crimes), produced by Vagner de Almeida and Richard Parker, is the first documentary film about brutalities committed against homosexuals in Brazil. In the directors' view, the hate crimes come from different segments of society, and that the Catholic Church and radical evangelical groups are also responsible for the rising intolerance, when they actively fight against the civil rights of non-heterosexuals. The film exposes life in metropolitan Rio de Janeiro, where various perpetrators murder members of the LGBT community with impunity. In the first months of 2008, there were 45 officially registered homicides against gays; some of the crimes included mutilations. Among the victims were gay men and lesbians, but also a large number of transsexuals.

The numbers produced by the Grupo Gay da Bahia (GGB) have occasionally been contested on the grounds that they include all murders of LGBT people reported in the media – that is, not only those motivated by prejudice against homosexuals. Reinaldo de Azevedo, columnist of the right-wing Veja magazine, Brazil's most-read weekly publication, called the GGB's methodology "unscientific" based on the above objection.

A Brazilian gay blog that has investigated a few of the murders of gay people reported in the media – including some used by the GGB in its national statistic report – determined that the majority of murders from their chosen sample were committed by the partners of the victims or those who were otherwise sexually involved with them (e.g., male prostitutes), with some others being killed due to unpaid debts with gangs involved in drug trafficking. The blog also criticized the GGB for not publishing the names of all of the victims the GGB includes in its report to calculate the murder rate so that the motives of the crimes could be independently assessed.

According to Grupo Gay da Bahia, 343 LGBT people were murdered in Brazil in 2016, 387 in 2017, and 420 in 2018. This was an increase compared to 2001 (130 murders) and 2008 (187 murders). Of the 420 victims in 2018, 39% were gay men, 36% were transsexuals, 12% were lesbians and 2% were bisexuals. When divided by race, 213 were white (58.4%), 107 were mestizo (29.3%) and 45 were black (12.3%). Firearms were the most commonly used instruments in these crimes. The northern and central-western parts of Brazil recorded the most homicides, with the state of Alagoas registering the highest percentage of murders.

According to association Transgender Europe, Brazil has the highest number of murdered transgender people, with 900 homicides between 2008 and 2016, far ahead of Mexico (271), and nearly half of 2.264 registered murders in the world.

Politics
 

There are many pro-LGBT political parties in Brazil; the most influential are the Socialism and Liberty Party, the Workers' Party and the Communist Party of Brazil. The most influential pro-LGBT politicians in Brazil are Marta Suplicy Smith, Eduardo Suplicy and Jean Wyllys. During the 2010 presidential elections in Brazil, all five presidential candidates were favorable to same-sex civil unions, including the elected President Dilma Rousseff.

In 2010, there were 190 political candidates who signed the Brazilian Association of Gays, Lesbians, Bisexuals and Transsexuals's "Declaration of Commitment". Those elected included 1 governor, 1 senator, 17 congressmen/congresswomen and 25 state representatives.

The Brazilian executive power has guaranteed many rights to LGBT Brazilians, such as the same social security pension benefits that heterosexual couples receive; the creation of the federal LGBT Council; prison visitation by same-sex couples; same income tax benefits that heterosexual couples receive; federal government recognition of same-sex marriages or same-sex civil unions for immigration purposes; health benefits for same-sex couples and mandatory health plans in the country; and LGBT people have a special place in Brazilian prisons, separate from other prisoners. Transsexuals have the right to be called by social name and not by birth name and be forwarded to women's prisons. LGBT people in prisons also have the right to choose male or female clothing.

One of the candidates for the City Council of Salvador, Bahia, the third largest city in Brazil, was Leo Kret (Republican Party (PR-BA)), a transvestite club dancer who was the most voted for of the candidates. When she took office, she defied the dress code norms insisting that her wardrobe would be strictly feminine and insisted on using the women's restroom. Leo Kret received 12,861 votes in the city in the municipal elections of 2008. On election day, she said that she will defend LGBT rights. She has aspirations to become the President of Brazil one day.

Moacyr Sélia, a transvestite hairdresser, sought reelection as a Nova Venécia councilmember, in the north of the state of Espírito Santo, representing the Republican Party. She was already the president of the Chamber of Parliament in two occasions.

Former President Jair Bolsonaro, elected to the Brazilian presidency in October 2018, has drawn controversy for his homophobic rhetoric. As "a self-declared homophobe", Bolsonaro has said he would prefer a dead son than a gay one. On January 2, 2019, just hours after his inauguration, he removed concerns regarding the LGBT community from being considered by the Human Rights Ministry and named no other federal agency to consider such issues. Bolsonaro also removed the HIV prevention task force after they began a campaign towards educating transgender Brazilians. There is also a risk that Bolsonaro will attempt to remove the 2013 decision to legalize same-sex marriage as he declared the decision "a blow to family unity and family values."

Following the 2018 Brazilian general election, Fabiano Contarato was elected as the first openly gay federal senator and Érica Malunguinho as the first trans woman representative. On February 1, 2019, David Miranda, a black gay representative, replaced Jean Wyllys, as Wyllys announced in January 2019 that he had left the country due to death threats.

Notwithstanding such progress, the Human Rights Measurement Initiative points out that 45% of human rights experts identified LGBTQIA+ people as being at risk of having the right to participate in government violated.

LGBT plan and conference

Plan
The Federal Government of Brazil released in 2009 the National Plan of Promotion of the Citizenship and Human Rights of LGBT (Plano Nacional de Promoção da Cidadania e Direitos Humanos de LGBT), a groundbreaking national plan to promote the rights of gays, lesbians, bisexuals and transgender people.

The plan may also play an important role in the approval of a law which would criminalize homophobic acts. The plan is composed of 51 key policies developed in June 2008 at the National LGBT Conference. It includes:

 The legalization of adoption rights by homosexual couples, and the equality of civil rights of homosexual couples;
 The development of a sexual diversity educational program in the curriculum of military and police officers;
 The revision of the current restriction for homosexuals to donate blood;
 The right to automatically change name and sex without having to file a lawsuit in the case of transgender individuals;
 Rating television programming which contains homophobic content as inappropriate for children and adolescents;
 Adding homosexual families as a theme to educational books.

Conference
The first National Conference for Lesbians, Gay Men, Bisexuals, Transvestites and Transsexuals (LGBT) was launched in 2008 by Brazilian Government, in the federal capital of Brasília. The event, the first in the world to be convened by a government, is a result of demands made by civil society and the Brazilian Government's support of LGBT rights. The Conference adopted the theme "Human rights and public policies: the way forward for guaranteeing the citizenship of Lesbians, Gay Men, Bisexuals, Transvestites and Transsexuals."

During the conference, public policies were defined for this segment of the population and a National Plan for the Promotion of LGBT Citizenship and Human Rights was prepared. An evaluation was made of the 2004 federal government programme Brazil Without Homophobia to combat violence and discrimination against the LGBT population.

The holding of the conference coincided with the commemoration of the 60th anniversary of the Universal Declaration of Human Rights and reaffirmed the Federal Government's commitment to the issue of LGBT human rights. Marta Suplicy, Tourism Minister and a longstanding supporter of LGBT rights, commemorated the initiative. "At long last, after so many years, we are finally able to hold this Conference. It's a giant's stride forward for Brazil." For the Justice Minister, Tarso Genro, the LGBT Conference was a demonstration of respect for human rights. "A human rights agenda that does not contemplate this issue is incomplete," he declared. Also present at the opening ceremony were the Minister of the Special Department for Human Rights, Paulo Vannuchi, Senator Fátima Cleide of the Parliamentary Front for LGBT Citizenship, Minister of the Department for Racial Equality Policies Edson Santos, Minister of the Special Department for Women's Policies Nilcéa Freire, and the directors of the Ministry of Health's National Sexually Transmitted Disease and AIDS Programme, Mariângela Simão and Eduardo Barbosa.

The conference was convened by a decree issued by Brazil's president, Luiz Inácio Lula da Silva, and published in the Official Federal Gazette. Approximately 700 delegates took part with 60% civil society participation and 40% governmental participation. There were a further 300 observers. 16 ministries collaborated with the process of drafting the base-text document on public policies discussed during the event.

Prior to the National Conference, conferences were held in Brazil's 27 states, convened by the state governors, in order to develop complementary proposals for the national policy document, define state-level policies and elect the delegates to the National Conference. More than 100 conferences were held at a municipal level.

Religion and LGBT rights
Brazil is a secular state, in which there exists a separation of church and state. The country's most followed religion is Catholicism.

The Catholic Church teaches that homosexual acts are disordered and immoral, but some more progressive bishops in Brazil have a hard time divulging it publicly. Many Protestant churches hold the same basic position as the Catholic Church. In mainline liberal Protestant denominations, there is an effort to avoid homophobia.

And while most of the conservative churches keep silent on the issue, Brazil has seen the growth of gay-friendly churches such as the Metropolitan Community Church, a denomination which originated in the United States. Apart from religious people, moral disapproval of homosexuality has been rare, because of the social pressures condemning prejudice and homophobia.

Among evangelicals, there are some campaigns to reach out to homosexual men and women. Movimento pela Sexualidade Sadia (Social Movement for a Healthy Sexuality), an evangelical group headed by an ex-homosexual, leads efforts to evangelize in gay parades, talking about Christianity to participants and delivering leaflets featuring the testimonials of "ex-gays" and "ex-lesbians".

There may be a religious factor in Brazilian homosexuality. A minority of the Brazilian population adheres to Candomblé and other Afro-Brazilian religions (similar to Santería), where homosexuality is commonly accepted. For a comparison, there are some 19,000 recognized Catholic parishes in Brazil. Informal Candomblé temples are supposed to number some 12,000 in Rio de Janeiro alone. In Candomblé, many priests and priestesses are homosexual. Luiz Mott, the leader of the gay movement in Brazil, is a firm adherent of Candomblé. Many famous Brazilians turn to Afro-Brazilian religions in search of miracles to solve personal or family problems. Even former President Fernando Henrique Cardoso, though an atheist, had sympathy for and sometimes visited Candomblé rituals. Another minority of the Brazilian LGBT population adheres to alternative pagan groups, like Wicca, where homosexuality is also accepted.

In June 2018, the General Synod of Anglican Episcopal Church of Brazil voted to change its marriage canon to allow same-sex couples to get married.

Opposition
The main opponents of the advances of the gay rights movement in Brazil have generally been conservatives. Religion is the most cited reason for opposing gay rights. Regionally, opposition to the gay rights movement has been strongest in rural interior regions.

A national study from 2005 found that 80% of the Brazilian population opposed homosexuality and another survey in 2010 found that 63% of the population opposed civil unions between homosexual couples. Followers of the Catholic and Protestant faiths, specifically the Pentecostal and historical Protestant denominations, are the most likely to oppose homosexuality. However, followers of spiritist or Afro-Brazilian, along with religious "nones" are the least likely to oppose homosexuality and homosexual civil unions.

Catholic and evangelical politicians have also been trying to counter gay rights through the introduction of bills. Among them were Bill 2279/03 put forward by Representative Elimar Damasceno. It strove to ban public kissing between people of the same sex. Bill 2177/03, authored by Representative Neucimar Fraga, would have created an assistance program for sexual reorientation of persons who voluntarily opt for changing their sexual orientation from homosexuality to heterosexuality.

State representative Edino Fonseca, an Assembly of God government minister, introduced a bill in the Legislative Assembly of Rio de Janeiro to establish social services to support men and women wanting to "leave" homosexuality. He also introduced a bill to protect evangelical groups offering assistance to such men and women from discrimination and harassment. The latter bill faced severe opposition as well. It says: "No divulging of information on the possibility of support and/or the possibility of sexual reorientation of homosexuals is to be considered prejudice."

None of these bills has been made into law.

Brazilian gay culture

Gay parades

The São Paulo Gay Pride Parade is one of the biggest events of its kind in the world, if not the biggest. It is also one of the major tourist events in São Paulo. The event has official support from the City Government of São Paulo. The parade happens yearly, usually in June. It is the beginning of Brazilian winter, when temperatures are lower, but rains are rare. The Parada do Orgulho LGBT de São Paulo (São Paulo LGBT Pride Parade) has been organized since 1997, with the aims of bringing visibility to LGBT people and fomenting the creation of public policies for homosexuals, bisexuals, transvestites and transsexuals.

The main strategy is to occupy public spaces so as to make possible an effective exchange of experiences, elevate the self-esteem of homosexuals and sensibilise society towards tolerance and acceptance of differences. During the parade, LGBT people "unite and help build bridges and guarantee the plenitude of their rights".

More activities have been added to the event, such as the Cycle of Debates, the LGBT Cultural Fair, the Citizenship Award in Respect of Diversity, and the successful Gay Day, that happens on the Saturday before the main parade. The Cultural Fair has been part of the pride parade since 2001. APOGLBT (Associação da Parada do Orgulho LGBT de São Paulo) has recognized political and cultural initiatives which value the citizenship of LGBT people, every year since 2001.

Besides the São Paulo parade, several other Brazilian cities organize their own LGBT parades, mainly in the capitals of the states, such as Rio de Janeiro with about 1.5 million people, and Salvador with around 800,000 people.

Annual pride parades and events are held in all states, Acre (Rio Branco), Alagoas (Maceió, Arapiraca), Amapá (Macapá), Amazonas (Manaus, Parintins, Manacapuru), Bahia (Salvador), Ceará (Fortaleza, Juazeiro do Norte), the Federal District, Espírito Santo (Vitória), Goiás (Goiânia, Aparecida de Goiânia, Anápolis), Maranhão (São Luís), Mato Grosso (Cuiabá), Mato Grosso do Sul (Campo Grande, Dourados), Minas Gerais (Belo Horizonte, Uberlândia, Contagem, Juiz de Fora, Betim), Pará (Belém, Ananindeua), Paraíba (João Pessoa), Paraná (Curitiba, Londrina, Maringá), Pernambuco (Recife, Olinda, Caruaru), Piauí (Teresina, Parnaíba), Rio de Janeiro (Rio de Janeiro, São Gonçalo, Duque de Caxias, Nova Iguaçu, Niterói), Rio Grande do Norte (Natal), Rio Grande do Sul (Porto Alegre, Caxias do Sul, Pelotas), Rondônia (Porto Velho), Roraima (Boa Vista), Santa Catarina (Florianópolis), São Paulo (São Paulo, Guarulhos, Campinas, São Bernardo do Campo, Santo André), Sergipe (Aracaju), and Tocantins (Palmas), among numerous other cities.

Brazilian LGBT Activists

Jean Wyllys 
Jean Wyllys is a prominent gay activist in Brazil. Wyllys was born in 1974 in a small town near Bahia. He was one of seven children and had to start working at the age of 10 to help his family financially. He earned his degree and became a journalist after moving to Salvador and Rio de Janeiro. He first found fame on the television show Big Brother in Brazil and soon became a popular gay rights activist in the country.

Wyllys was elected federal MP for the Socialism and Liberty party in 2010 and then was elected in 2011 to the Brazilian Chamber of Deputies as the first openly gay congressman. He served two terms in this position. His last election in October 2018 was supposed to start his third term in office, however he decided to quit this position and leave Brazil before the term began. He made this decision as the result of rising death threats to him and his family and after his close friend, Marielle Franco, an openly gay congresswoman, was killed in March 2018. Wyllys stated in an interview that the decision to leave the country and his job was difficult but also stated he wanted to live to continue fighting for the gay rights movement, saying in an interview "...we will do much more when the new time comes."

Míriam Martinho 
Míriam Martinho is an important figure in the feminist and lesbian rights movement in Brazil. Martinho began her activism by working on a publication called ChanacomChana, a newspaper that focused on lesbianism and feminism. The group that published this newspaper, the Lesbian-Feminist Movement, disbanded and later became the Lesbian-Feminist Action Group (GALF). Martinho was a part of the "Brazilian Stonewall" movement in 1983 where activists from GALF protested against discrimination at Ferro's bar, which was a popular bar in the lesbian community at the time. Since the mid-1990s, the date of the "Brazilian Stonewall" event, August 19, has become the Day of Lesbian Pride. 

Martinho has remained heavily involved in the lesbian and feminist movement in Brazil and has written several publications on lesbianism and the gay rights movement. One of her publications was included in the report by the Immigration and Refugee Board of Canada discussing lesbian discrimination in Brazil. She now works as a journalist and editor-in-chief for the website "Um Outro Olhar," that focuses on the LGBT movement around the world with a focus on lesbian issues. She also writes on the blogs "Contra o Coro dos Contentes" and "Memória/História MHB-MLGBT."

Summary table

See also

 Same-sex marriage in Brazil
 Human rights in Brazil
 Beyond Carnival by James N. Green.
 João W. Nery

General:
 LGBT rights in the Americas

Notes

References

External links

Legal Information, LGBT Rights, Brazil 
Official website of Grupo Gay da Bahia. (in Portuguese)
Official website of Associação Brasileira de Gays, Lésbicas, Bissexuais, Travestis, Transexuais e Intersexos. (in Portuguese)
Official Website of OutRight Action International
Official Website for International Federation for Human Rights (LGBTI Rights)

 
Brazil